Totschnig is a German surname. Notable people with the surname include:

 Brigitte Totschnig (born 1954), Austrian skier
 Georg Totschnig (born 1971), Austrian cyclist
 Harald Totschnig (born 1974), Austrian cyclist

German-language surnames